The siege of Athens and Piraeus was a siege of the First Mithridatic War that took place from Autumn of 87 BC to the Spring and Summer of 86 BC. The battle was fought between the forces of the Roman Republic, commanded by Lucius Cornelius Sulla Felix on the one hand, and the forces of the Kingdom of Pontus and the Athenian City-State on the other. The Greek Pontian forces were commanded by Aristion and Archelaus.

Historical context 

The invasion of Mithridates VI of Pontus, the king of the Kingdom of Pontus into the Kingdom of Bithynia, an ally of Rome, coupled with the assassination of Roman Citizens in the Asiatic Vespers, caused war between Rome and Pontus. Allegedly up to 80,000 Roman citizens were massacred. Asia was then occupied by the forces of Mithridates VI of Pontus under the command of Archelaus and before long, Mithridates VI had won over all the Greek city states who had previously been under Roman rule. In the spring of 87 BC Roman forces under Sulla landed at Dyrrachium, in Illyria. Sulla’s first target was Athens, ruled by a Mithridatic puppet; the tyrant Aristion. Sulla moved southeast, picking up supplies and reinforcements as he went. Sulla’s chief of staff was Lucullus, who went ahead of him to scout the way and negotiate with Bruttius Sura, the existing Roman commander in Greece. After speaking with Lucullus, Sura handed over the command of his troops to Sulla. At Chaeronea, ambassadors from all the major cities of Greece (except Athens) met with Sulla, who impressed on them Rome's determination to drive Mithridates from Greece and Asia Province. Sulla then advanced on Athens.

The siege 

Sulla marched towards Athens and upon his arrival he encountered his first problem. The main outer wall that had surrounded the city, connecting the main city with its port at Piraeus, was in ruins. As such, Sulla was forced to conduct two separate sieges, throwing up siege works surrounding both Athens and its port Piraeus. A force commanded by Archelaus defended Piraeus whilst another commanded by Aristion took up the main defense of Athens. The sea defense was considerably easier as a Pontic fleet dominated the nearby sea, facilitating reinforcement and replenishment whenever necessary. Furthermore, Piraeus already had ample supplies from the onset while Athens did not.

Sulla decided to first concentrate his attacks on Piraeus, seeing as without its port, there was no way that Athens could be resupplied. He sent Lucius Licinius Lucullus to raise a fleet from the remaining Roman allies in the eastern Mediterranean to deal with the Pontic navy. The first attack on the city was entirely repulsed, so Sulla decided to build huge earthworks. Wood was also needed, so he cut down everything, including the sacred groves of Greece, up to 100 miles from Athens main town. When more money was needed he “borrowed” from temples and Sibyls alike. The currency minted from this treasure was to remain in circulation for centuries and prized for its quality. Siege works were built to facilitate the next attack which was eventually successful in taking the outer wall of Piraeus.

Once the outer wall was taken, Sulla discovered that Archelaus had built more walls inside the city. Despite the complete encirclement of Athens and its port, and several attempts by Archelaus to raise the siege, a stalemate seemed to have developed. Roman attention was temporarily shifted towards Athens. Athens by now was starving, and grain was at famine levels in price. Inside the city, the population was reduced to eating shoe leather and grass. A delegation from Athens was sent to treat with Sulla, but instead of serious negotiations they expounded on the glory of their city. Sulla sent them away saying: “I was sent to Athens, not to take lessons, but to reduce rebels to obedience.”

Soon Sulla's camp was to fill with refugees from Rome, fleeing the massacres of Marius and Cinna. These also included his wife and children, as well as those of the Optimate party who had not been killed. With his political enemies having taken power in Rome, Sulla realized that the money and reinforcements he believed were coming to bolster his forces were no longer something to be counted on. For this reason, Sulla ordered the sacking of every temple and religious site in the vicinity. The chronicles state that one of the people sent on such a sacking mission became afraid due to ominous voices having been heard upon entering the temple. Deciding not to continue sacking the temple, the soldier returned to Sulla who ordered him back stating that he had heard laughter because the gods would be pleased with his victory.

With Athens on the verge of starvation, Aristion grew less popular by the day. Greek deserters informed Sulla that Aristion was neglecting the Heptachalcum (part of the city wall). Sulla immediately sent sappers to undermine the wall. Nine hundred feet of wall was brought down between the Sacred and Piraeic gates on the southwest side of the city.

On 1 March 86 BC, after five months under siege, a midnight sack of Athens began. After the taunts of Aristion, Sulla was not in a mood to be magnanimous. Blood was said to have literally flowed in the streets, it was only after the entreaties of a couple of his Greek friends (Midias and Calliphon) and the pleas of the Roman Senators in his camp that Sulla decided enough was enough. After setting fire to large portions of the city, Aristion and his forces fled to the Acropolis where they had gathered a store of supplies over the preceding few weeks.

At the same time, Archelaus abandoned the city of Piraeus and concentrated his forces in the citadel of the city. Sulla, in a bid to stop an escape by Archelaus who would surely join his reinforcement army sent by Mithridates VI elsewhere in Greece,  left the taking of the Acropolis to Gaius Scribonius Curio Burbulieus. In any case, Sulla, not having a navy, was powerless to stop the escape of Archelaus who was able to rejoin his relief army. Sulla then advanced into Boeotia to take on Archelaus's armies and remove them from Greece. Before leaving the area however, he burnt the city of Piraeus to the ground.

While Aristion and his party were able to stave off the Roman attackers for some time, they eventually surrendered after their water ran out and after they had heard of the Pontic defeat at the Battle of Chaeronea (Perhaps late Spring). They were all executed shortly after their surrender.

Consequences 

After routing the Pontic army at the Battle of Chaeronea, Sulla had another victory at the Battle of Orchomenus the following year. Sulla and Mithridates VI of Pontus finally got together in 85 BC to sign the Treaty of Dardanos, concluding the First Mithridatic War.

Sulla's army took Athens on the Kalends of March, in the consulate of Marius and Cinna, February 12 86 BC. The siege of Athens was a long and brutal campaign, Sulla's rough battle hardened legions, veterans of the Social War thoroughly devastated the city. Athens had chosen the wrong side in this struggle, portrayed as a war of Greek freedom against Roman domination.

It was punished severely, a show of vengeance that ensured Greece would remain docile during later civil wars and Mithridatic wars.

See also 
 First Mithridatic War
 Lucius Cornelius Sulla Felix

References

Bibliography

Contemporary sources

Modern sources

External links 

 
 
 

80s BC
86 BC
Roman Athens
80s BC conflicts
1st century BC in the Roman Republic
87 BC
1st century BC in Greece
Mithridatic Wars
Athens
Athens
Athens
Looting